Wally is a British English expression referring to a "silly or inept person", which later developed into an umbrella term for "vulnerable individuals".

It is thought to have originated at a pop festival in the late 1960s or early 1970s; many sources suggest the 1970 Isle of Wight Festival. On hearing the name "Wally" being announced many times over a loudspeaker, the crowd took it up as a chant, and random shouts of "Wally" were subsequently heard at rock concerts all over Britain. It was still being called out at the 1979 Led Zeppelin Knebworth Concerts.

In 1974 a group of new age travellers were encamped near Stonehenge, and to help hinder the process of eviction by the landowners, all gave their name as Wally of Wessex, "Wally being a conveniently anonymous umbrella for vulnerable individuals".

See also
 John Doe
 Karen Eliot
 Open pop star

References

Further reading
 Wally (from Weely), Pseudo Dictionary, 17 July 2006. An alternative theory that the cry of Wally started at the Weeley Festival.
 The Weeley Festival. Clacton On Sea. Essex. August 27-29 1971, The Archive: a history of UK rock festivals, Last update Oct 2007. Refutation that the cry of Wally started at Weeley, and that it started the year before (1970) at the Isle of Wight Festival.
 Inside Out Extra: WEELEY - LET IT ROCK!, BBC, Wednesday April 21, 2004. More on the origins of Wally debate.	
 Isle of Wight Festival - History, BBC Hampshire, Retrieved 2009-01-26.

Collective pseudonyms